Beyond Uncertainty: Heisenberg, Quantum Physics, and the Bomb is a biography of Werner Heisenberg by David C. Cassidy. Published by Bellevue Literary Press in 2009, the book is a sequel to Cassidy's 1992 biography, Uncertainty: the Life and Science of Werner Heisenberg and serves as an updated and popularized version of the work. The release of new material after the 1992 publication of the first book rekindled controversy surrounding Heisenberg and his role in the German nuclear weapons program, resulting in the need for an updated version of the biography. The book's name is adapted from the first biography, whose title is taken from Heisenberg's uncertainty principle.

Background 
The book serves as an updated and popularized version of Cassidy's 1992 biography, Uncertainty: the Life and Science of Werner Heisenberg. Some reviewers noted that the book's target audience is the general public, rather than scientists and historians. The book does not contain any formulas or even experimental setups; concepts are described only qualitatively. The book uses resources that were not available in 1992, including documents from the Soviet archives. Some of this new material, and the Michael Frayn play Copenhagen rekindled controversy surrounding Heisenberg and his role in the German nuclear weapons program, resulting in the need for an updated version of the biography. The book takes its name, Beyond Uncertainty, from the first book, Uncertainty, which itself is named after the quantum mechanics concept Heisenberg's uncertainty principle.

Content 
Table of contents:

 The Early Years
 The World at War
 The Gymnasium Years
 The Battle of Munich
 Finding His Path
 Sommerfeld’s Institute
 Confronting the Quantum
 Modeling Atoms
 Channeling Rivers, Questioning Causality
 Entering the Quantum Matrix
 Awash in Matrices, Rescued by Waves
 Determining Uncertainty
 Reaching the Top
 New Frontiers
 Into the Abyss
 Social Atoms
 Of Particles and Politics
 Heir Apparent
 The Lonely Years
 A Faustian Bargain
 One Who Could Not Leave
 Warfare and Its Uses
 A Copenhagen Visit
 Ordering Reality
 Professor in Berlin
 Return to the Matrix
 One Last Attempt
 Explaining the Project: Farm Hall
 Explaining the Project: The World
 The Later Years

Reception
The book was reviewed by Sam Kean, Sara Jane Lippincott, and Benjamin B. Bederson in 2009 as well as Michael D. Gordin in 2010 and Alexander Soifer in 2011. Publishers Weekly posted a review that stated the book "offers a new view of the German wunderkind", is "[e]xhaustively detailed yet eminently readable", and "is an important book", though it noted the book "moves too quickly through Heisenberg’s 30 postwar years." A review in Physics Today wrote that the book "is interesting, well written, and amply documented" and that the book provides an "excellent discussion of science, society, and the influence of the individual scientist." Lippincott wrote in The Los Angeles Times that the book is "an excellent piece of science writing". The book has received several other reviews as well. In 2016, Gerald Holton called the book a "definitive biography";. it has been used as a benchmark for other books on Heisenberg. In his review, Benjamin B. Bederson called the book a "masterful work" that "carefully describes the private and public lives of Heisenberg" and wrote: "One can gain a pretty full picture of Heisenberg and of German and Western European physics during that amazing time by reading this single volume." He goes on to state that "hopefully for the last time" the work "clearly debunks the claim" that Heisenberg actively hindered the German atomic bomb project. Michael D. Gordin, in his review, called the book "a page-turner". Alexander Soifer, in his review, wrote that the "book is very well written, and is an easy popular reading".

Publication history 
  (hardcover)
  (paperback)
  (eBook)
  (audiobook)

See also 
 Atomic Spy
 The End of the Certain World
 Subtle is the Lord

References

Sources

External links 
 Publisher's website
 Author's personal website

2009 non-fiction books
American biographies
Books about the history of physics
German biographies
Werner Heisenberg
Bellevue Literary Press books